Kimsa Misa (Aymara kimsa three, misa offering,  also spelled Quimsa Mesa) is a mountain in the Andes of Bolivia which reaches a height of approximately  . It is located in the Oruro Department, Sajama Province, at the border of the municipalities of Curahuara de Carangas and Turco. Kimsa Misa lies north of Wayna Potosí.

References 

Mountains of Oruro Department